Go!Messenger was a free Instant Messenger program for the PlayStation Portable. It was jointly developed by SCEE and BT. It was introduced to the system with the 3.90 firmware update and the Go!Messenger icon was added under Network. PSP users could communicate with PC users through Go!Messenger if the PC was running BT Softphone 2.

The software was announced on August 22, 2007 by Sony Computer Entertainment Europe at the 2007 Leipzig Games Convention, and was released on February 29, 2008. It allowed the Go!Cam to be used for video conferencing and voice chat.

When the service was functional, Go!Messenger allowed users to:
Send Instant Messages to each other
Video Chat with the Go!Cam
Send Video and Voice Messages to other PSP users

Discontinuation and removal 

Because use of the service did not meet Sony and BT's expectations, the service was discontinued on 31 March 2009. Subsequently, the 5.50 firmware update removes the Go!Messenger icon from the Network group.

References 

PlayStation Portable
Sony Interactive Entertainment
BT Group
Instant messaging clients